Deivi is a given name. Notable people with the name include:

Deivi Cruz (born 1972), Dominican baseball player
Deivi García (born 1999), Dominican baseball player
Deivi Julio (born 1980), Colombian boxer

See also
Divi (disambiguation)